Oswalt is a German surname or male given name, which is derived from the Old English given name Oswald. The name may refer to:

John N. Oswalt (born 1940), American scholar
Oswalt Kolle (1928–2010), German sex educator
Patton Oswalt (born 1969), American actor and comedian
Roy Oswalt (born 1977), American baseball player

References

German-language surnames
cy:Oswallt